The New Apostolic Church is one of the main Christian denominations of Pakistan. It had more than 200,000 members in 2003.
It belongs to the area of the D. AP. Mark Woll and D. AP helper Frank Dzur. The in-charge for Pakistan is Apostle IFRAHEEM ROSHAN He is the most responsible personality for New Apostolic Church Pakistan. There are five more area heads with five bishops and four Apostles working with  Apostle AP IFRAHEEM ROSHAN

New Apostolic Church is a registered organization. Its administration office (http://nacpk.org/contact/) is situated in Lahore.

New Apostolic Church Pakistan is working on the ground roots of Christian Community in Pakistan. It has various types of teaching material to upgrade in the divine knowledge of different age groups. To meet this purpose the church has National Level Committees like Sunday School Committee, Confirmation Committee Youth Committee, Music Committee, and Teaching Committee It is the only Church in Pakistan whose ministers are not only working in the city areas but also in the remote areas of Punjab, Sindh, and K.P.K provinces united with their International Church Leader, the Chief Apostle, through their District Apostle, their District Apostle Helper, and their Lead Apostle engage their efforts to strengthen the unity in the congregations. It is their heartfelt concern to contribute to the unity of Christianity. The one  of the goals (as it was also once again described by the Chief Apostle Jean Luc Schneider) is not to unite all Christians into a single denomination, but rather to create a climate of trust and mutual appreciation where the things that bind us together as Christians are emphasized.

The main goal of the faith is the preparation for the return of Lord Jesus Christ.

See also 
Christianity in Pakistan
Persecution of Christians

References 

Christian denominations in Asia
Churches in Pakistan
New Apostolic Church